Holly Pond is a town in Cullman County, Alabama, United States.  As of the 2010 census the town's population was 798. The town was incorporated in 1906.

History

Holly Pond was first settled in the 1840s, and gets its name from two natural ponds that were surrounded by holly trees.  The community expanded in the 1850s in anticipation of railroad construction, and by 1888 a post office had been established.

Geography
Holly Pond is located in eastern Cullman County at  (34.174657, -86.617004). The town is concentrated around the intersection of U.S. Route 278 and State Route 91.

Demographics

2020 census

As of the 2020 United States census, there were 851 people, 368 households, and 258 families residing in the town.

2000 census
As of the census of 2000, there were 645 people, 250 households, and 182 families residing in the town. The racial makeup of the town was 97.67% White, 0.47% Native American, 0.16% Asian, 1.40% from other races, and 0.31% from two or more races.  3.41% of the population were Hispanic or Latino of any race.

There were 250 households, out of which 36.4% had children under the age of 18 living with them, 59.2% were married couples living together, 9.2% had a female householder with no husband present, and 26.8% were non-families. 22.8% of all households were made up of individuals, and 11.2% had someone living alone who was 65 years of age or older.  The average household size was 2.58 and the average family size was 3.06.

In the town, the population was spread out, with 27.0% under the age of 18, 11.5% from 18 to 24, 31.5% from 25 to 44, 20.2% from 45 to 64, and 9.9% who were 65 years of age or older.  The median age was 31 years. For every 100 females, there were 104.8 males.  For every 100 females age 18 and over, there were 102.1 males.

The median income for a household in the town was $28,182, and the median income for a family was $31,875. Males had a median income of $27,708 versus $19,432 for females. The per capita income for the town was $13,466.  About 12.2% of families and 19.5% of the population were below the poverty line, including 26.9% of those under age 18 and 29.8% of those age 65 or over.

Education

Holly Pond High School is the town's main high school for grades 9-12.  As of 2022, enrollment is 338 students and the principal is Janet Turner. Holly Pond competes in AHSAA Class 2A athletics. The school's mascot is a Bronco. 

Holly Pond Middle School is the town's middle school for grades 6-8. It was established in 2008 by the Cullman County Board of Education.  The current principal is Cynthia Roden.

Holly Pond Elementary School is the town's elementary school for grades K-5. The current principal is Karen Sparks.

All schools are part of the Cullman County Board of Education and have a common campus in central Holly Pond.

Notable person
Guy Hunt, former Governor of Alabama and Primitive Baptist pastor, was born and lived in Holly Pond.
Former ABC 33-40 and WHNT Channel 19 meteorologist Jason Simpson grew up in Holly Pond.

References

External links

Holly Pond community website

Towns in Cullman County, Alabama
Towns in Alabama
1840s establishments in Alabama